Brdarica is a village in Serbia. It is situated in the Koceljeva municipality, in the Mačva District of Central Serbia. The village had a Serb ethnic majority and 1,519 inhabitants in 2002.  There is a large Romani minority in the village numbering 488 persons or about one third of the population.

Historical population

1948: 1,603
1953: 1,710
1961: 1,753
1971: 1,675
1981: 1,690
1991: 1,618
2002: 1,519
2011: 1,180

Notable people 

 Atanasije Jevtić (1938–2021), Serbian Orthodox bishop and theologian

References

See also
List of places in Serbia

Populated places in Mačva District
Romani communities in Serbia